The Star of Bombay is a 182-carat (36.4-g) cabochon-cut star sapphire originating in Sri Lanka. The violet-blue gem was given to silent film actress Mary Pickford by her husband, Douglas Fairbanks.  She bequeathed it to the Smithsonian Institution. It is the namesake of the popular alcoholic beverage Bombay Sapphire, a British-manufactured gin.

Description  
The Star of Bombay is a 182 carat (36.4-g) cabochon-cut star sapphire. According to Southern Jewelry News, "The Star of Bombay sapphire belongs to the mineral species corundum. Pure corundum is colorless, but trace amounts of transition elements like vanadium or chromium result in different colors in the crystal. The Star of Bombay’s violet-blue color is caused by the presence of titanium and iron giving the blue tint, and vanadium contributing to its violet back color."

History 
The Star of Bombay originates from Sri Lanka and is one of the largest star sapphires which have names unrelated to their origin, the other being the Star of India.
It is the namesake of the popular alcoholic beverage Bombay Sapphire, a British-manufactured gin. The gem was first acquired by Trabert & Hoeffer Inc. of Park Avenue in New York City and was set in a platinum ring. It is believed that the ring was purchased by Douglas Fairbanks, a famous silent film movie star and that he would give the ring to Mary Pickford. A 1935 advertisement for the Star of Bombay had it listed at 60 carats and did not include information on its origins and described it as "In all the world the only one".

In 1979, Mary Pickford died and bequeathed the Star of Bombay, to the Smithsonian Museum. Edward Stotsenberg of the Mary Pickford Foundation called the Smithsonian and a representative was sent out to examine the stone. According to Stotsenberg, the representative stated that the Star of Bombay was much brighter than other stones and pried it from the clasps and returned to the Smithsonian with it. The gem is currently displayed in the Smithsonian's National Museum of Natural History, in the Janet Annenberg Hooker Hall of Geology, Gems and Minerals.

See also
Star of India (gem)
Star of Artaban
Star of Asia
List of individual gemstones
List of sapphires by size

References

Individual sapphires
Jewellery in the collection of the Smithsonian Institution
Gems of Sri Lanka